The following events occurred in February 1903:

February 1, 1903 (Sunday)
The Mumbles-based British lifeboat James Stevens capsizes at the mouth of the River Afan in Wales while on its way to rescue the stranded Christina, resulting in the deaths of six of her fourteen crew, mostly volunteers who worked as oyster fishermen.
Died: Sir George Stokes, 1st Baronet, 83, Irish mathematician and physicist

February 2, 1903 (Monday)
Born: Bartel Leendert van der Waerden, Dutch mathematician, in Amsterdam (died 1996)

February 3, 1903 (Tuesday)
Born: Douglas Douglas-Hamilton, 14th Duke of Hamilton, Scottish politician and pioneering aviator, in London (died 1973)

February 4, 1903 (Wednesday)
Born: Alexander Imich, Polish-born American parapsychologist and chemist, in Częstochowa (died 2014)

February 5, 1903 (Thursday)
In the South Antrim by-election in Ireland, brought about by the resignation of Irish Unionist MP William Ellison-Macartney, Charles Curtis Craig retains the seat for the party.
Born: Koto Matsudaira, Japanese diplomat, ambassador to the United Nations, in Tokyo (died 1994)

February 6, 1903 (Friday)
Born: Claudio Arrau, Chilean pianist, in Chillán (died 1991)

February 7, 1903 (Saturday)
Died: James Glaisher, 93, English meteorologist and aeronaut

February 8, 1903 (Sunday)
Born:
Greta Keller, Austrian cabaret singer and actress, in Vienna (died 1977)
Tunku Abdul Rahman, Malaysian politician, first Chief Minister of the Federation of Malaysia, in Alor Setar, Kedah  (died 1990)

February 9, 1903 (Monday)

February 10, 1903 (Tuesday)
Born:
Waldemar Hoven, German physician and war criminal, in Freiburg (executed 1948)
Matthias Sindelar, Austrian footballer, in Kozlov (died 1939, carbon monoxide poisoning)

February 11, 1903 (Wednesday)
Oxnard strike of 1903: Japanese and 200 Mexican laborers become charter members of the Japanese-Mexican Labor Association (JMLA); it is the first time in U.S. history that a labor union has been formed by members of different races. 
Anton Bruckner's 9th Symphony receives its première in Vienna, Austria, conducted by Ferdinand Löwe, nearly seven years after the composer's death.

February 12, 1903 (Thursday)
The aircraft engine that will power the Wright brothers' first airplane later in 1903 is run for the first time in Dayton, Ohio, United States. It is the first successful attempt to build a heavier-than-air aircraft engine.
Randall Davidson is enthroned as the Archbishop of Canterbury at Canterbury Cathedral in England, succeeding the late Frederick Temple.
The North British Locomotive Company is established in Glasgow, Scotland, through a merger of manufacturing companies Dübs, Neilson, Reid, and Sharp Stewart.

February 13, 1903 (Friday)
Venezuelan crisis of 1902–03: Britain, Germany and Italy reach a settlement with Venezuela, ending the naval blockade imposed because of the country's refusal to pay foreign debts and reparation for damages suffered by European citizens in the Federal War. The settlement is achieved through American intervention by means of the Washington Protocols. 
Born: Georges Simenon, Belgian writer, in Liège (died 1989)

February 14, 1903 (Saturday)
Born: Stuart Erwin, American actor, in Squaw Valley, California (died 1967)
Died: Archduchess Elisabeth Franziska of Austria, 72, Hungarian noblewoman, widow of Archduke Ferdinand Karl Viktor of Austria-Este and Archduke Karl Ferdinand of Austria

February 15, 1903 (Sunday)
Morris and Rose Michtom introduce the first teddy bear in the United States, naming it after U.S. President Theodore Roosevelt.

February 16, 1903 (Monday)
Romanian inventor Traian Vuia tells the Académie des Sciences of Paris about his procedure for taking off in a heavier-than-air mechanical machine. His ideas are rejected.
Born: Edgar Bergen, American ventriloquist and actor, in Chicago (died 1978)

February 17, 1903 (Tuesday)

February 18, 1903 (Wednesday)

February 19, 1903 (Thursday)

February 20, 1903 (Friday)
King Edward VII of the United Kingdom approves a redesign of the Flag of Australia, on which the stars of the Southern Cross are combined with the Union Jack.

February 21, 1903 (Saturday)
Born:
Anaïs Nin, French writer, in Neuilly-sur-Seine (died 1977)
Raymond Queneau, French poet and novelist, in Le Havre (died 1976)

February 22, 1903 (Sunday)
Born:
Morley Callaghan, Canadian writer and media personality, in Toronto (died 1990)
Ain-Ervin Mere, Estonian Nazi, in Vändra (died 1969)
Frank P. Ramsey, English mathematician, in Cambridge (died 1930)
Died: Hugo Wolf, 42, Austrian composer (syphilis)

February 23, 1903 (Monday)
Cuba leases Guantánamo Bay to the United States "in perpetuity" under the terms of the Cuban–American Treaty.

February 24, 1903 (Tuesday)
Born: Vladimir Bartol, Slovene author, in Trieste, Austria-Hungary (died 1967)

February 25, 1903 (Wednesday)
 Born: King Clancy, Canadian ice hockey player, Ottawa, Ontario (died 1986)

February 26, 1903 (Thursday)
The ocean liner SS Columbus, later renamed by the White Star Line as Republic, is launched by Harland and Wolff at Belfast, Northern Ireland.
Born: Giulio Natta, Italian chemist, Nobel Prize laureate, in Imperia (died 1979)
Died: Richard Jordan Gatling, 84, American inventor

February 27, 1903 (Friday)
Battle of Kwatarkwashi: Forces from the British-administered Protectorate of Northern Nigeria defeat the army of the Sokoto Caliphate's Kano Emirate, effectively ending self-government of the emirate.
Born: Grethe Weiser, German actress, in Hanover (died 1970)

February 28, 1903 (Saturday)
Born: Vincente Minnelli, American director, in Chicago (died 1986)

References

1903
1903-02
1903-02